Intikhab Alam Khan (Urdu:) (born 28 December 1941) is a Pakistani cricket coach and former cricketer who played in 47 Test matches and four One Day Internationals from 1959 to 1977. He captained Pakistan in 17 Tests between 1969 and 1975. He also played in English county cricket for Surrey between 1969 and 1981. Prior to this Intikhab was professional for several years at West of Scotland Cricket Club in Glasgow and also coached at The Glasgow Academy. In August 1967, at the Oval, he joined Asif Iqbal for a ninth wicket stand of 190 runs. This remained as a World record for around 30 years.

Intikhab was Pakistan's first One Day International cricket captain. He played 3 matches as captain, winning two and losing one. He was the manager of the team in 1992 Cricket World Cup winning Pakistani team.

In 2004, he was appointed the first foreigner to coach a domestic Indian cricket team, coaching Punjab in the Ranji Trophy.

On 25 October 2008, he was once again named manager of the Pakistan cricket team by PCB, a day after Australian Geoff Lawson was sacked as the national coach of Pakistan.

In 2009, Intikhab was the manager of the team when Pakistan had their first Twenty20 World Cup title by defeating Sri Lanka in the final.

References

External links
 

1941 births
Living people
Pakistan Test cricketers
Pakistan One Day International cricketers
Pakistan Test cricket captains
Pakistani cricket captains
Surrey cricketers
International Cavaliers cricketers
Pakistani cricket coaches
Cricketers from Hoshiarpur
Coaches of the Pakistan national cricket team
Marylebone Cricket Club cricketers
Recipients of the Pride of Performance
Pakistani cricketers
Karachi cricketers
Karachi C cricketers
Karachi Whites cricketers
Karachi Blues cricketers
Pakistan International Airlines cricketers
Karachi A cricketers
Pakistan International Airlines A cricketers
Sindh cricketers
North Zone (Pakistan) cricketers
Punjab (Pakistan) cricketers
Church Mission School alumni
D. H. Robins' XI cricketers